State Road 436 (SR 436), known as Semoran Boulevard for most of its length and Altamonte Drive in Altamonte Springs, is a north-south road (east-west after US 17/92) in the Orlando area running from US 441 in Apopka to the Beachline Expressway near Orlando International Airport.  Constructed in the late 1960s, the road passes through Seminole County, Florida and Orange County, Florida.  Because of this, the common name for SR 436 is a portmanteau of the names of the two counties: "Sem" and "oran", hence "Semoran Boulevard."  The common pronunciation of "Semoran" resembles that term of Cimarron.

Route description
SR 436 is signed north-south south of Seminole County, while west of the county, it is signed east-west. The road without the state road number starts at SR 417. Then starting at the intersection with SR 528 at the Orlando International Airport, SR 436 runs north and intersects with SR 15 and SR 552. It then intersects Florida State Road 408 and then intersects with SR 50. Florida 436 then turns to the west after the interchange with US 17 and US 92 (U.S.17-92). This intersection was considered to be one of the deadliest intersections in the nation with an average of three traffic accidents per day. Heading west, the road enters Altamonte Springs, Florida and has interchange with I-4 It then intersects SR 434 still heading west.  The road then has intersections at Wekiva Springs Road and Sheeler Avenue before ending at US 441.

History
Construction began in October 2011 on a $24.5 million project to build a flyover ramp from eastbound SR 436 to Red Bug Lake Road in Casselberry in order to reduce congestion from motorists having to wait at a traffic light to turn onto Red Bug Lake Road. On February 1, 2014, the flyover ramp from eastbound SR 436 to Red Bug Lake Road opened to traffic. In late 2013, the Florida Department of Transportation began an $80 million project to construct a flyover interchange with US 17-92 traveling over SR 436 in Casselberry. This interchange was built to alleviate congestion at one of the busiest intersections in Florida. The flyover interchange was completed on April 6, 2015, with a ribbon-cutting ceremony held.

Major intersections

References

External links

436
436
436
436